Sherrington is a small village and civil parish on the River Wylye in Wiltshire, England.

The part of the Great Ridge Wood known as Snailcreep Hanging lies entirely within Sherrington.

Location
Sherrington is near the larger village of Codford and is near the edge of Salisbury Plain. Sherrington is part of the Cranborne Chase & West Wiltshire Downs Area of Outstanding Natural Beauty.

History
There are a number of prehistoric barrows in the parish.

Sherrington has the remains of a motte-and-bailey castle, presumed to have been made late in the 11th or early in the 12th century. Now a scheduled ancient monument, the mound rises to a height of 5.5m and is 48m across.

The village has a large mill pond.

The Post Office Directory of Hampshire, Wiltshire, and Dorsetshire (1855) says of Sherrington:

Parish church 

Sherrington had a parish church by 1252, which was dedicated to Saints Cosmas and Damian by 1341. It was completely rebuilt in 1624, re-using the early 14th century east and west windows of the original building. The west bellcot was added in the 19th century.

The octagonal stone font is from the 13th century. Other fittings, including pews and the pulpit, are 17th-century and described by English Heritage as "little altered". On the plaster walls are painted cartouches with Biblical texts, one dated 1630. The church was recorded as Grade I listed in 1968.

The benefice was united with Boyton in 1909, although the parishes remained distinct. Today the parish is served by the Upper Wylye Valley Team, which covers ten rural parishes.

Other buildings 
The Old Rectory is a late 17th century building, extended and altered in the 19th. Under the thatched roof, the north front is in dressed limestone.

Local government
Most local government services are provided by Wiltshire Council, which has its offices in Trowbridge, some twelve miles to the north. With fewer than one hundred residents, Sherrington has no elected parish council, and instead has a Parish Meeting at which all electors may attend and vote.

Boundary changes in 2010 created a new constituency of South West Wiltshire which incorporates the parish. Sherrington's current Member of Parliament is Andrew Murrison, while its representative in the Wiltshire Council unitary authority is Christopher Newbury. Both are Conservatives.

References

Sources

External links

Villages in Wiltshire
Civil parishes in Wiltshire